The 2019 Maidstone Borough Council election took place on 2 May 2019 to elect members of Maidstone Borough Council in England. This was on the same day as other local elections.

Results Summary

Ward results

Allington

Bearsted

Boxley

Coxheath & Hutton

Detling & Thurnham

Downswood & Otham

East

Fant

Harrietsham & Lenham

High Street

Leeds

Loose

Marden & Yalding

North

Shepway North

South

Staplehurst

Sutton Valence & Langley

References

2019 English local elections
2019
2010s in Kent